The Mont-Fallère or Mont Fallère (sometimes wrongly spelled in Italian as Fallere) is a 3,061.5 metres high mountain belonging to the Italian side of Pennine Alps.


Geography 

The Mont-Fallère is located on the ridge dividing the Great St Bernard Valley (North and East) from the Valdigne, a term and used to define the upper part of the Aosta Valley.  Administratively the mountain is the tripoint connecting the Italian comunes of Sarre, Gignod and Saint-Pierre.

SOIUSA classification 
According to SOIUSA (International Standardized Mountain Subdivision of the Alps) the mountain can be classified in the following way:
 main part = Western Alps
 major sector = North Western Alps
 section = Pennine Alps
 subsection = Grand Combin Alps
 supergroup = Catena Grande Rochère-Grand Golliaz
 group = Grande Rochère-Monte Fallère
 subgroup = Gruppo del Monte Fallère
 code = I/B-9.I-A.2.b

Access to the summit 
The mountain can be accessed by signposted routes or from Thouraz (1.652 m), a village in the comune of Sarre, or from Vétan (Saint-Pierre). Both of them require some hiking experience. The top of Mont-Fallère offers a good point of view on Mont Blanc, Grand Combin, Grivola and many other peaks of the Graian and Pennine Alps.

Mountain huts 
 Refuge du Mont-Fallère (2,385 m).

Maps
 Military Geographic Institute (IGM) official maps of Italy, 1:25.000 and 1:100.000 scale, on-line version
 Carta dei sentieri e dei rifugi scala 1:50.000 n. 5 Cervino e Monte Rosa, Istituto Geografico Centrale - Torino

External links

References

Alpine three-thousanders
Mountains of Aosta Valley
Pennine Alps